Romania competed at the 1956 Summer Olympics in Melbourne, Australia and Stockholm, Sweden (equestrian events). 44 competitors, 33 men and 11 women, took part in 35 events in 10 sports.

Medalists

|  style="text-align:left; width:72%; vertical-align:top;"|

| style="text-align:left; width:23%; vertical-align:top;"|

Gold
 Nicolae Linca — Boxing, Men's Welterweight
 Leon Rotman — Canoeing, Men's C1 1.000m Canadian Singles
 Leon Rotman — Canoeing, Men's C1 10.000m Canadian Singles
 Alexe Dumitru and Simion Ismailciuc — Canoeing, Men's C2 1.000m Canadian Pairs
 Ștefan Petrescu — Shooting, Men's Rapid-Fire Pistol

Silver
 Mircea Dobrescu — Boxing, Men's Flyweight
 Gheorghe Negrea — Boxing, Men's Light Heavyweight
 Olga Orban-Szabo — Fencing, Women's Foil Individual

Bronze
 Constantin Dumitrescu — Boxing, Men's Light Welterweight
 Elena Leuşteanu — Gymnastics, Women's Floor Exercises
 Gheorghe Lichiardopol — Shooting, Men's Rapid-Fire Pistol
 Francisc Horvat — Wrestling, Men's Greco-Roman Bantamweight
 Elena Leuşteanu, Georgeta Hurmuzachi, Sonia Iovan, Emilia Vătăşoiu-Liţă, Elena Mărgărit-Niculescu, and Elena Săcălici — Gymnastics, Women's Team Combined Exercises

Athletics

Boxing

Canoeing

Fencing

Two fencers, both women, represented Romania in 1956.

Women's foil
 Olga Orban-Szabo
 Ecaterina Orb-Lazăr

Gymnastics

Modern pentathlon

Three male pentathletes represented Romania in 1956.

Individual
 Cornel Vena
 Dumitru Țintea
 Victor Teodorescu

Team
 Cornel Vena
 Dumitru Ţintea
 Victor Teodorescu

Shooting

Four shooters represented Romania in 1956. In the 25 m pistol event Ștefan Petrescu won gold and Gheorghe Lichiardopol won bronze.

25 m pistol
 Ștefan Petrescu
 Gheorghe Lichiardopol

300 m rifle, three positions
 Constantin Antonescu

50 m rifle, three positions
 Iosif Sîrbu
 Constantin Antonescu

50 m rifle, prone
 Iosif Sîrbu
 Constantin Antonescu

Swimming

Water polo

Wrestling

References

Nations at the 1956 Summer Olympics
1956
1956 in Romanian sport